Alexandru Roṣca (23 August 1906 – 17 February 1996) was a Romanian psychologist and professor. In 1991, he was elected a titular member of the Romanian Academy.

Works
 Psihopatologia deviaților morali (1931) 
 Adaptarea socială (1938) 
 Motivele acțiunii umane (1943) 
 Tehnica psihologiei experimentale și practice (1947) 
 Tratat de psihologie  experimentală (1963)  
 Psihologia muncii industriale (1967) 
 Metodologie și tehnici experimentale în psihologie (1971) 
 Psihologie generală (1976) 
 Sinteze de psihologie contemporană (1980)

References

1906 births
1996 deaths
People from Cluj County
Romanian Austro-Hungarians
Babeș-Bolyai University alumni
Academic staff of Babeș-Bolyai University
Romanian psychologists
Titular members of the Romanian Academy
20th-century psychologists